Phostria latiapicalis is a moth in the family Crambidae. It is found in Costa Rica and Panama.

References

Moths described in 1912
Phostria
Moths of Central America